The combativity award is a prize given in the Tour de France for the most combative rider overall during the race. Historically, it favored constant attackers as it was based on the distance spent in a breakaway, included winning checkpoints and outright stage wins. Today, the winner is chosen by a jury. Besides the overall winner, the jury also awards a combativity award to the most aggressive rider at the end of each stage, with this rider allowed to wear a red number the following race day.

The 1981 Tour de France marked the last time the winner of the general classification also won the combativity award.

History 
Since 1952, after every stage the most combative cyclist was given an award, and an overall competition was recorded. At the end of the 1956 Tour de France, André Darrigade was named the most attacking cyclist. At this point, the award was given the same importance as the award for the cyclist with the most bad luck, Picot in 1956.

In 1961, the award was not given to an individual cyclist, but to an entire team, the regional team West-South-West.

The system of the award has changed over the years. Historically, riders accumulated points, and the cyclist with the most points at the end of the Tour was declared the winner. The cyclist did not have to finish the race, for example in 1971 Luis Ocaña crashed out while wearing the yellow jersey on the Col de Menté in stage 14 and in 1972 Cyrille Guimard was wearing the green jersey and in 2nd place overall when he withdrew, but both were still given the combativity award.

In 1979, the combativity award was initially given to Joop Zoetemelk; he was later disqualified and Hennie Kuiper received the award.

In a system that was implemented in 2003, a jury of eight specialists in cycling selected the most combative cyclist of each stage (excluding time trials), with the classification for most distance in breakaway groups only part of the decision.

There is no jersey for the most combative rider of the previous stage, but he can be recognized by the race number worn on his back: it consists of a white number on a red background instead of the usual black on white (since 1998).

At the end of the Tour de France, a "super-combativity award" is given to the most combative cyclist of the race. , the total prize money for the super-combativity award winner is €20,000.

Winners 
Overall super-combativity award winners since 1953.

Notes

References 

Tour de France classifications and awards
Cycling jerseys